Máximo González was the defending champion when the event was last held in 2015, but he chose not to defend his title.

Francisco Comesaña won the title after defeating Mariano Navone 6–0, 6–3 in the final.

Seeds

Draw

Finals

Top half

Bottom half

References

External links
Main draw
Qualifying draw

Corrientes Challenger - 1